is a railway station in the city of Jōetsu, Niigata, Japan  operated by the third-sector operator Hokuetsu Express.

Lines

Station layout
The station is located on a bridge between two tunnel portals, and has one elevated side platform with the station building underneath. The station is unattended.

Platforms

Adjacent stations

History
The station opened on 22 March 1997 with the opening of the Hokuhoku Line.

Passenger statistics
In fiscal 2017, the station was used by an average of 68 passengers daily (boarding passengers only).

Surroundings area
former Oshima village hall

References

External links

 Hokuetsu Express station information 

Railway stations in Niigata Prefecture
Railway stations in Japan opened in 1997
Stations of Hokuetsu Express
Jōetsu, Niigata